Jens Otto Harry Jespersen (16 July 1860 – 30 April 1943) was a Danish linguist who specialized in the grammar of the English language. Steven Mithen described him as "one of the greatest language scholars of the nineteenth and twentieth centuries."

Early life
Otto Jespersen was born in Randers in Jutland. He was inspired by the work of Danish philologist Rasmus Rask as a boy, and with the help of Rask's grammars taught himself some Icelandic, Italian, and Spanish. He entered the University of Copenhagen in 1877 when he was 17, initially studying law but not forgetting his language studies. In 1881 he shifted his focus completely to languages, and in 1887 earned his master's degree in French, with English and Latin as his secondary languages. He supported himself during his studies through part-time work as a schoolteacher and as a shorthand reporter in the Danish parliament.

In June, 1886, Jespersen became a member of the International Phonetic Association, then called The Phonetic Teachers' Association. In fact the idea of creating a phonetic alphabet that could be used by every language was first put forward by Jespersen in a letter he sent to Paul Passy.

In 1887–1888, he traveled to England, Germany and France, meeting linguists like Henry Sweet and Paul Passy and attending lectures at institutions like Oxford University. Following the advice of his mentor Vilhelm Thomsen, he returned to Copenhagen in August 1888 and began work on his doctoral dissertation on the English case system. He successfully defended his dissertation in 1891.

Academic life and work
Jespersen was a professor of English at the University of Copenhagen from 1893 to 1925, and served as Rector of the university in 1920–21. His early work focused primarily on language teaching reform and on phonetics, but he is best known for his later work on syntax and on language development.

He advanced the theories of Rank and Nexus in Danish in two papers: Sprogets logik (1913) and De to hovedarter af grammatiske forbindelser (1921). Jespersen in this theory of ranks removes the parts of speech from the syntax, and differentiates between  primaries, secondaries, and tertiaries; e.g. in "well honed phrase," "phrase" is a primary, this being defined by a secondary, "honed", which again is defined by a tertiary "well". The term Nexus is applied to sentences, structures similar to sentences and sentences in formation, in which two concepts are expressed in one unit; e.g., it rained, he ran indoors. This term is qualified by a further concept called a junction which represents one idea, expressed by means of two or more elements, whereas a nexus combines two ideas.  Junction and nexus proved valuable in bringing the concept of context to the forefront of the attention of the world of linguistics.

He was most widely recognized for some of his books. Language: Its Nature, Development and Origin (1922) is considered by many to be his masterpiece. Modern English Grammar on Historical Principles (1909–1949), concentrated on morphology and syntax, and Growth and Structure of the English Language (1905) is a comprehensive view of English by someone with another native language, and still in print, over 70 years after his death and more than 100 years after publication. Late in his life he published Analytic Syntax (1937), in which he presents his views on syntactic structure using an idiosyncratic shorthand notation. In The Philosophy of Grammar (1924) he challenged the accepted views of common concepts in grammar and proposed corrections to the basic definitions of grammatical case, pronoun, object, voice etc., and developed further his notions of Rank and Nexus. In the 21st century this book is still used as one of the basic texts in modern structural linguistics. Mankind, Nation and Individual: from a linguistic point of view (1925) is one of the pioneering works on sociolinguistics.

Jespersen visited the United States twice: he lectured at the Congress of Arts and Sciences in St. Louis in 1904, and in 1909–1910 he visited both the University of California and Columbia University. While in the U.S., he took occasion to study the country's educational system. His autobiography (see below) was published in English translation as recently as 1995.

After his retirement in 1925, Jespersen remained active in the international linguistic community. In addition to continuing to write, he convened and chaired the first International Meeting on Linguistic Research in Geneva in 1930, and acted as president of the Fourth International Congress of Linguists in Copenhagen in 1936.

Jespersen was an important figure in the international language movement. He was an early supporter of the Esperanto offshoot Ido and in 1928 published his own project Novial. He also worked with the International Auxiliary Language Association.

Jespersen received honorary degrees from Columbia University in New York (1910), St. Andrews University in Scotland (1925), and the Sorbonne in Paris (1927). He was one of the first six international scholars to be elected as honorary members of the Linguistic Society of America. He was elected a foreign member of the Royal Netherlands Academy of Arts and Sciences in 1931.

Bibliography

 1889: The articulations of speech sounds represented by means of analphabetic symbols. Marburg: Elwert.
 
 1899: Fonetik: En systematisk Fremstilling af Læren om Sproglyd. Copenhagen: Schubothe
 1904: How to teach a foreign language. London: S. Sonnenschein & Co. 1928 printing available online through OpenLibrary.org.
 1905: Growth and Structure of the English Language
 1909–1949: A Modern English Grammar on Historical Principles (in seven volumes; the title should be understood as 'A grammar of Modern English') originally published by Carl Winter, Heidelberg, later vols. by Ejnar Munksgard, Copenhagen and George Allen & Unwin, London (Vols. 5–7, issued without series title, have imprint: Copenhagen, E. Munksgaard, 1940–49; Imprint varies: Pt.5–6: London: Allen & Unwin; pt.7: Copenhagen: Munksgaard, London: Allen & Unwin.)
 1922: Language: Its Nature, Development, and Origin
 1924: The Philosophy of Grammar
 1925: Mankind, nation and individual: from a linguistic point of view. H. Aschehoug (det Mallingske bogtryk.), 1925
 1928: An International Language (the introduction of the Novial language)
 1930: Novial Lexike Novial to English, French and German dictionary.
 1933: Essentials of English Grammar
 1937: Analytic Syntax
 1938: En sprogmands levned, Copenhagen, Jespersen's autobiography
 1941: Efficiency in linguistic change
 1993: A literary miscellany: proceedings of the Otto Jespersen Symposium April 29–30, edited by Jørgen Erik Nielsen and Arne Zettersten 1994
 1995: A Linguist's Life: an English translation of Otto Jespersen's autobiography, edited by Arne Juul, Hans Frede Nielsen and Jørgen Erik Nielsen, Odense

Essays and articles (selected)
 What is the use of phonetics?, in: Educational Review (February 1910)
 Nature and Art in Language, in: American Speech 5 (1929), pp. 89ff (Part 1, Part 2)
 Adversative Conjunctions, in: Linguistica (1933)

See also
Dania transcription
Interlinguistics
Prosiopesis

References

External links
 
 
 
 
 "Otto Jespersen", by Niels Haislund, in: Englische Studien 75 (1943), pp. 273–282 (reprinted in: Thomas A. Sebeok, Portraits of Linguists, vol. 2, Bloomington & London: Indiana U.P. 1966 , pp. 148–57).
 Otto Jespersen Online Bibliography
 Otto Jespersen in University of Warwick ELT Archive
 Otto Jespersen in Encyclopædia Britannica

Linguists of English
1860 births
1943 deaths
People from Randers
Linguists from Denmark
Danish autobiographers
Danish Esperantists
Idists
Syntacticians
Interlingua
Novial
Alumni of the University of Oxford
University of Copenhagen alumni
Academic staff of the University of Copenhagen
Constructed language creators
Members of the Royal Netherlands Academy of Arts and Sciences
Paleolinguists
Rectors of the University of Copenhagen
Phoneticians
Corresponding Fellows of the British Academy